Stirches is an area of Hawick in the Scottish Borders, mostly consisting of ex-council housing built in 1973. It is often considered to be one of the more desirable housing schemes in the town.

See also
Wilton Dean
List of places in the Scottish Borders
List of places in Scotland
John James Scott-Chisholme, a native of Stirches, and a cavalry officer in the Second Anglo-Boer War who died heroically. He was a pupil at Loretto School, Musselburgh.

References

Villages in the Scottish Borders
Hawick